George Gaynes (born George Jongejans; May 16, 1917 – February 15, 2016) was a Finnish-born American singer, actor, and voice artist. Born to Dutch and Russian-Finnish parents in the Grand Duchy of Finland of the Russian Empire, he served in the Royal Netherlands Navy during World War II, and subsequently emigrated to the United States, where he became a citizen and began his acting career on Broadway.

Gaynes' most recognized roles in cinema were that of Commandant Eric Lassard in the Police Academy series and as John Van Horn in the 1982 comedy film Tootsie. He appeared as Senator Strobe Smithers in the hit TV show Hearts Afire; as the curmudgeonly but lovable foster parent Henry Warnimont on the NBC series Punky Brewster; as high-powered theatrical producer Arthur Feldman on The Days and Nights of Molly Dodd, in which Gaynes' real-life wife, Allyn Ann McLerie, co-starred as his love interest; and as Frank Smith, the mob boss brought down by Luke Spencer (Anthony Geary) and Laura Spencer (Genie Francis) on the soap opera General Hospital.

Early life
Gaynes was born on May 16, 1917, in Helsinki, in what was then the Grand Duchy of Finland, part of the Russian Empire (Finland became independent that year), the son of Iya Grigorievna de Gay (later known as Lady Abdy), a Russian artist of Finnish descent, and Gerrit Jongejans, a Dutch businessman. His uncle was the actor Gregory Gaye. He was raised in France, England, and Switzerland. Gaynes graduated from the  Collège Classique Cantonal near Lausanne in 1937. He also attended the Music School of Milan from 1938 to 1939, and many years later trained at the Actors Studio in New York City from 1953 to 1958.

World War II
In 1940, Gaynes lived in France, but after the Battle of France and the German occupation, he escaped to the Pyrenees, but was soon arrested by the Francoist Spain police. In 1942 after his release, Gaynes intended to return to the Netherlands to join the Dutch resistance against the Nazi occupation, but instead made his way to the United Kingdom to enlist in the Royal Dutch Navy. On April 8, 1943, Gaynes was commissioned as a seaman recruit and assigned to the auxiliary ship HNLMS Oranje Nassau, which was stationed at Holyhead in Wales. Because of his multilingualism (he spoke Dutch, English, French, Italian, and Russian), he was detached on May 1, 1943, to the Royal Navy as a translator assigned to the convoy commodore aboard , which participated during July and August 1943 in Operation Husky the Allied invasion of Sicily. On September 1, 1943, Gaynes was reassigned to the destroyer , which participated during January 1944 in the Battle of Anzio. On January 1, 1944, he was promoted to sergeant (petty officer, 1st class). After the Battle of Anzio, HMS Wilton was assigned to the Adriatic Sea and continued to see action during the Adriatic Campaign. On July 14, 1946, Gaynes was honorably discharged from the Royal Dutch Navy.

Career
In 1946, Gaynes returned to France, but an American theater director offered him a role in a Broadway musical and he moved to New York City later that year and became an American citizen in 1948. During this time, his best-known appearances were in Wonderful Town, the musical version of My Sister Eileen. Gaynes alternated between stage musicals and both comedic and dramatic plays, including his role as Bob Baker in the original production of Wonderful Town (1953), Jupiter in the Cole Porter musical Out of This World (credited as George Jongejans), Gilbert and Sullivan operettas, and as Henry Higgins in the 1964 U.S. tour of My Fair Lady. In television, Gaynes played the role of Henry Warnimont, the eventual foster father for Punky Brewster in the eponymous series. He also provided the voice for Henry in the animated Ruby-Spears version of the show. Behind the camera, he directed the last episode of WKRP in Cincinnati. Films in which he appeared include The Way We Were, Nickelodeon, and Tootsie.

Entering films and television in the early 1960s, Gaynes was a regular on the TV daytime dramas Search for Tomorrow (replacing Robert Mandan in the role of Jo's husband, Sam Reynolds) and General Hospital (originating the role of mobster Frank Smith), and showed up in such movies as The Group (1966), Marooned (1969), and Doctor's Wives (1971). He appeared in one episode of the sci-fi television series Sliders as the old-aged version of Quinn Mallory, played by Jerry O'Connell. In 1984, he played Commandant Lassard, the titular leader, in the first of seven Police Academy movies. In 1994, he played Serybryalzov in Louis Malle's acclaimed independent feature, Vanya on 42nd Street.

Personal life and death
Gaynes was married to  stage and television actress and dancer Allyn Ann McLerie from December 20, 1953, until his death; they had two children, Matthew Gaynes and Iya Gaynes Falcone Brown. Matthew was shortlisted for the Olympic team the year that President Jimmy Carter boycotted the 1980 Olympics after the Soviet invasion of Afghanistan. Matthew died in a car crash in India in 1989.

In addition to Gaynes joining the cast of his wife's series The Days and Nights of Molly Dodd in 1989,  McLerie and he had previously worked together on Punky Brewster, when she guest starred in a first-season episode as a love interest of Henry Warnimont's.

Gaynes died at his daughter's home in North Bend, Washington, on February 15, 2016, at the age of 98.

Filmography

Film

Television

References

External links

 
 
 
 
 George Gaynes at the University of Wisconsin's Actors Studio audio collection

1917 births
2016 deaths
20th-century American male actors
21st-century American male actors
American male film actors
American male television actors
American male musical theatre actors
American male stage actors
American male soap opera actors
American male voice actors
American male singers
American male comedians
American people of Finnish descent
American people of Russian descent
Male actors from Helsinki
Royal Netherlands Navy personnel
Royal Netherlands Navy personnel of World War II
Dutch emigrants to the United States
Emigrants from the Russian Empire to the United States
Singers from Helsinki
Washington (state) Democrats
People from North Bend, Washington
People with acquired American citizenship
20th-century American comedians
21st-century American comedians